Allen Ludden's Gallery is a short-lived syndicated television talk show (1969) hosted by Allen Ludden, best known as the host of the game shows G.E. College Bowl and Password. Sixty episodes were taped and syndicated to 22 markets. His co-hosts were his wife, actress Betty White, and musical director H.B. Barnum, "a black man, but he's not on this show as a token Negro. He's here because we have the right chemistry and he's talented and a good friend," Ludden told The Boston Herald Traveler (6/17/69). Ludden also said he hoped the show would attract younger viewers, but it proved to be a failure.

References 
McNeil, Alex. Total Television, Penguin Books, 1980.
The Boston Herald, 6/17/69

American television talk shows